Lenquete is a village in the Gabú Region of central-eastern Guinea-Bissau. It lies to the northwest of Gabú.

References

External links
Maplandia World Gazetteer

Populated places in Guinea-Bissau
Gabu Region